The 1977 Asia Golf Circuit was the 16th season of golf tournaments that comprised the Asia Golf Circuit.

Taiwan's Hsieh Min-Nan was the overall circuit champion for the third time despite missing the cut in the final event, having built up an unassailable lead in the points standings by adding a runner-up finish in the Korea Open to his two victories earlier in the season.

Tournament schedule
The table below shows the 1977 Asian Golf Circuit schedule.

Final standings
The Asia Golf Circuit operated a points based system to determine the overall circuit champion, with points being awarded in each tournament to the leading players. At the end of the season, the player with the most points was declared the circuit champion, and there was a prize pool to be shared between the top players in the points table.

References

Asia Golf Circuit
Asia Golf Circuit